Sergey Martynov (20 March 1971 – 1997) was a Russian wrestler who competed in the 1992 Summer Olympics and in the 1996 Summer Olympics.

References

1971 births
1997 deaths
Olympic wrestlers of the Unified Team
Olympic wrestlers of Russia
Wrestlers at the 1992 Summer Olympics
Wrestlers at the 1996 Summer Olympics
Russian male sport wrestlers
Olympic silver medalists for the Unified Team
Olympic medalists in wrestling
Medalists at the 1992 Summer Olympics